Eddie Marcos Melo Afonso (born 7 March 1994) is an Angolan footballer who plays for Petro de Luanda and the Angola national football team.

International career
Afonso made his senior international debut on 17 January 2016 in a 0-1 home loss against Cameroon for the Africa Nations Championship.

References

External links
 
Zerozero.pt profile

1994 births
Living people
Atlético Petróleos de Luanda players
C.R.D. Libolo players
Girabola players
Angolan footballers
Angola international footballers
Association football defenders
Footballers from Luanda
2019 Africa Cup of Nations players
2016 African Nations Championship players
Angola A' international footballers
2022 African Nations Championship players